I'm Alive is the tenth studio album by American singer-songwriter Jackson Browne, released in 1993 (see 1993 in music). The title track, "I'm Alive", reached  18 on the Album Rock Tracks chart and No. 28 on the Adult Contemporary chart. Other singles released from the album were "Everywhere I Go" (UK No. 67) and "Sky Blue and Black".

History
After veering heavily towards songs of a political nature on his two previous albums, longtime fans of Browne welcomed the return on I'm Alive to his previous style of songwriting.

The song "Too Many Angels" includes backing vocals by Jennifer Warnes, Valerie Carter, Doug Haywood, Katia Cardenal, and Ryan Browne, while the song "All Good Things" includes backing vocals by David Crosby and Don Henley. The song "Sky Blue and Black" was also featured in the pilot episode of American situation comedy Friends.

In an interview on Off Camera with Sam Jones, Jackson Browne stated that the song "I'll Do Anything" was originally written to be the title song for the James L. Brooks movie of the same name. It was to be a comedic song sung by Albert Brooks where he is begging a test audience to review his latest film favorably .

The album was certified as a gold record in 1995 by the RIAA. A television special aired on the Disney Channel on June 25, 1993, to coincide with this album, entitled "Jackson Browne: Going Home".

Reception

I'm Alive was considered somewhat of a comeback for Browne. Stephen Holden writing for The New York Times wrote "I'm Alive is a striking return to the kind of romantic subject matter that the Los Angeles singer and songwriter seemed to have abandoned after 1980 in favor of political songwriting. His finest album in nearly two decades, it has much in common with his 1974 masterpiece, Late For The Sky, whose songs also described the disintegration of a relationship."

Critic William Ruhlman agreed though did not consider the album as strong. "Longtime fans welcomed the album as a return in style... Browne eschewed the greater philosophical implications of romance and, falling back on stock imagery (angels, rain), failed to achieve an originality of expression. While it was good news that he wasn't tilting at windmills anymore, Browne did not make a full comeback with the album, despite a couple of well-constructed songs." The Rolling Stone Record Guide wrote Browne "returned to his forte: the personal joy and agony of day-to-day human interaction."

In the original Rolling Stone review for the album from 1993, Kara Manning expressed the belief that "Browne has successfully managed to resurrect his persona of 20 years ago. I'm Alive shudders with the pain of someone who's been soundly dumped. And Browne has even gained a sense of gallows humor. Between despondent cries for reconciliation, the singer indulges in refreshingly silly self-deprecation." However, she wondered, "what does a younger, angrier generation – raging to Dr. Dre and Nirvana – make of all this? But '70s nostalgia is on a roll..."

The album was in Q's list of "The 50 Best Albums Of 1993". It was voted number 456 in Colin Larkin's All Time Top 1000 Albums.

Track listing
All tracks composed by Jackson Browne.
"I'm Alive" – 5:01
"My Problem Is You" – 4:40
"Everywhere I Go" – 4:36
"I'll Do Anything" – 4:31
"Miles Away" – 3:52
"Too Many Angels" – 6:04
"Take This Rain" – 4:49
"Two of Me, Two of You" – 2:56
"Sky Blue and Black" – 6:06
"All Good Things" – 4:28

Personnel 
 Jackson Browne – lead vocals, acoustic guitar (1, 5, 6, 10), acoustic piano (2, 4, 7, 9, 10), guitar (3), backing vocals (6)
 Benmont Tench – Hammond organ (1, 2, 5–8, 10)
 Jai Winding – acoustic piano (8)
 Scott Thurston – guitar (1, 5, 9), backing vocals (1, 3, 5, 7), keyboards (3, 4, 6, 9, 10)
 Mark Goldenberg – guitar (1, 9)
 John Leventhal – guitar (2, 4), acoustic guitar (8)
 David Lindley – guitar (2), bouzouki (6), oud (6)
 Dean Parks – acoustic guitar (2)
 Waddy Wachtel – guitar (3, 7)
 Mike Campbell – guitar (5, 7, 10)
 Kevin McCormick – bass (1, 3–5, 7–10)
 James "Hutch" Hutchinson – bass (2, 6)
 Mauricio-Fritz Lewak – drums (1, 3–5, 7, 9, 10), additional drums (6) 
 Jim Keltner – drums (2, 6)
 Luis Conte – percussion (1–5, 7–10)
 Lenny Castro – percussion (2, 6)
 Sweet Pea Atkinson – backing vocals (2)
 Sir Harry Bowens – backing vocals (2)
 William "Bill" Greene – backing vocals (2)
 Arnold McCuller – backing vocals (2, 4, 9)
 Valerie Carter – backing vocals (4, 6, 9)
 Ryan Browne – backing vocals (6)
 Katia Cardenal – backing vocals (6)
 Doug Haywood – backing vocals (6)
 Jennifer Warnes – backing vocals (6)
 Steven Soles – backing vocals (7)
 David Crosby – backing vocals (10)
 Don Henley – backing vocals (10)

Production 
 Producers – Jackson Browne and Scott Thurston (Tracks 1, 3, 4, 5 & 7–10); Don Was (Tracks 2 & 6).
 Assistant Producer – Susann McMahon
 Engineers – Paul Dieter (Tracks 1, 3, 4, 5 & 7–10); Rik Pekkonen (Tracks 2 & 6).
 Assistant Engineers – Steve Onuska, Bob Salcedo and Kathy Yore.
 Mixed by Ed Cherney
 Recorded and Mixed at Groove Masters (Santa Monica, CA).
 Mastered by Gavin Lurssen and Doug Sax at The Mastering Lab (Los Angeles, CA).
 Technical Engineer – Ed Wong, assisted by Bill Irvin.
 Piano Technician – Edd Kolakowski 
 Art Direction – Robin Lynch
 Design – Robin Lynch and Alli Truch
 Photography – Bruce Weber
 Management – Donald Miller
 Management Staff – Veronica Albano, Michael Sexton, Donald Warnes and Randall Wixen.

Charts
Album – Billboard (United States)

Singles – Billboard (United States)

References

Jackson Browne albums
1993 albums
Albums produced by Don Was
Elektra Records albums
Albums recorded at Groove Masters Studios